In horology, a tourbillon ("whirlwind") is an addition to the mechanics of a watch escapement to increase accuracy. Conceived by the British watchmaker and inventor John Arnold, it was developed by his friend the Swiss-French watchmaker Abraham-Louis Breguet and patented by Breguet on 26 June 1801. In a tourbillon the escapement and balance wheel are mounted in a rotating cage, with the goal of eliminating errors of poise in the balance giving a uniform weight.

Tourbillons are still included in some modern wristwatches, where the mechanism is usually exposed on the watch's face to showcase it.

Types of tourbillon

Single axis tourbillon 

Patented by Breguet in 1801, the single axis tourbillon minimizes the difference in rate between positions caused by poise errors. The tourbillon was invented to complement the split bi-metallic balance which was inherently difficult to poise.

In the most common implementation of this, the tourbillon carriage is carried by the fourth pinion, within a stationary fourth wheel. The escape pinion is engaged with this stationary fourth wheel so when carriage is turned by the fourth pinion the escape wheel will also rotate. The carriage is released and locked with each vibration of the balance.

Double-axis tourbillon

Anthony Randall invented the double-axis tourbillon in January 1977 and subsequently patented it. The first working example was later constructed by Richard Good in 1978.  In 1980 Anthony Randall made a double-axis tourbillon in a carriage clock, which was located in the (now closed) Time Museum in Rockford, Illinois, US, and was included in their Catalogue of Chronometers.

In 2003, inspired by this invention, the young German watchmaker Thomas Prescher developed for the Thomas Prescher Haute Horlogerie the first flying double-axis tourbillon in a pocket watch and, in 2004, the first flying double-axis tourbillon with constant force in the carriage in a wristwatch. Shown at the Baselworld 2003 and 2004 in Basel, Switzerland.

A characteristic of this tourbillon is that it turns around two axes, both of which rotate once per minute.  The whole tourbillon is powered by a special constant-force mechanism, called a remontoire.  Prescher invented the constant-force mechanism to equalize the effects of a wound and unwound mainspring, friction, and gravitation. Thereby even force is always supplied to the oscillation regulating system of the double-axis tourbillon. The device incorporates a modified system after a design by Henri Jeanneret.

Double and quadruple tourbillons

Robert Greubel and Stephen Forsey launched the brand Greubel Forsey in 2004 with the introduction of their Double Tourbillon 30° (DT30). Both men had been working together since 1992 at Renaud & Papi, where they developed complicated watch movements. The Double Tourbillon 30° features one tourbillon carriage rotating once per minute and inclined at 30°, inside another carriage which rotates once every four minutes. In 2005, Greubel Forsey presented their Quadruple Tourbillon à Différentiel (QDT), using two double-tourbillons working independently. A spherical differential connects the four rotating carriages, distributing torque between two wheels rotating at different speeds.

Triple-axis tourbillon

In 2004, Thomas Prescher developed the first triple-axis tourbillon for the Thomas Prescher Haute Horlogerie with constant force in the carriage in a wristwatch. It was presented at Baselworld 2004 in Basel, Switzerland, in a set of three watches including a single-axis, a double-axis and a triple-axis tourbillon.

The world's unique tri-axial tourbillon movement for wristwatch, with traditional jewel bearings only, was invented by the independent watchmaker Aaron Becsei, from Bexei Watches, in 2007.  The Primus wristwatch was presented at the Baselworld 2008 in Basel, Switzerland.  In the three axis tourbillon movement, the 3rd (external) cage has a unique form which provides the possibility of using jewel bearings everywhere, instead of ball-bearings. This is a unique solution at this size and level of complication. There are a few wrist and pocket watches that include the Triple Axis or Tri-Axial Tourbillon escapements. Examples of companies and watchmakers that include this mechanism are Vianney Halter in his "Deep Space" watch, Thomas Prescher, Aaron Becsei, Girard-Perregaux with the "Tri-Axial Tourbillon", Purnell with the "Spherion", and Jaeger Le-Coultre with the "Gyrotourbillon".

Flying tourbillon
Rather than being supported by a bridge, or cock, at both the top and bottom, the flying tourbillon is cantilevered, being only supported from one side. The first flying tourbillon was designed by Alfred Helwig, instructor at the German School of Watchmaking, in 1920.

In 1993, Kiu Tai-Yu, a Chinese watchmaker residing in Hong Kong, created a semi-flying tourbillon with only an abbreviated carriage for the escapement wheel and pallet fork, the upper pivot of the balance wheel being supported in a sapphire bridge.

Gyro tourbillon
Jaeger-LeCoultre's first wristwatch tourbillon was introduced in 1993 (though JLC had produced tourbillons prior to that, including the famous observatory competition caliber 170) and in 2004 the company introduced the Gyrotourbillon I. Gyrotourbillon I is a double-axis tourbillon with a perpetual calendar and equation of time, and since then, Jaeger-LeCoultre has gone on to produce several variations on the multi-axis tourbillon theme. In general, these have been fairly thick watches (Gyrotourbillon I is 16mm thick) but with the Reverso Tribute Gyrotourbillon, JLC has produced a thinner and much more wearable version of its multi-axis tourbillon. At 51.1mm x 31mm x 12.4mm.

Modern tourbillon watches

In modern mechanical watch designs, production of a highly accurate watch does not require a tourbillon. There is even debate amongst horologists as to whether tourbillons ever improved the accuracy of mechanical watches, even when first introduced, or whether the watches of the day were inherently inaccurate due to design and manufacturing techniques.  A tourbillon is a valued feature of collectors' and premium-priced watches, possibly for the same reason that mechanical watches fetch a much higher price than similar quartz watches that are much more accurate.  High-quality tourbillon wristwatches, usually made by the Swiss luxury watch industry, are very expensive, and typically retail for tens of thousands of dollars or euros, with much higher prices in the hundreds of thousands of dollars or euros being common.  A recent renaissance of interest in tourbillons has been met by the industry with increased availability of time pieces bearing the feature, with the result that prices for basic tourbillon models have reduced somewhat in recent years. Previously such models were very rare, either antique or new. Any watch with a tourbillon will cost a great deal more than an equivalent piece without the feature. The prices of Swiss models typically start at $40,000 and the prices of more expensive tourbillon watches can reach six figures. The prices of some Chinese models can range from hundreds of dollars to nearly $5000.

Modern implementations typically allow the tourbillon to be seen through a window in the watch face. In addition to the decorative effect, a tourbillon can act as a second hand for some watches if it rotates exactly once per minute. Some tourbillons rotate faster than this (Greubel Forsey's 24-second tourbillon for example). Also, many quotidian watches feature their oscillating balance wheel. Sometimes termed, appropriately enough, the "open heart", these are sometimes misrepresented by unscrupulous dealers as a tourbillon (and "tourbillon-style" by ethical ones).

Improved affordability
Several Chinese manufacturers now produce a variety of tourbillon movements. These movements are bought as ébauches by some manufacturers and are sometimes incorporated into watches that meet the requirements of the Federation of the Swiss Watch Industry to be sold as Swiss Made, which requires 60% of the value to have been made in Switzerland. The availability of less expensive tourbillons has led industry spectators to worry that another quartz crisis may occur, where the Swiss watch industry will not be able to adapt quickly to less expensive complicated mechanical watches produced in other countries. In 2016, TAG Heuer began offering the Carrera Heuer-02T tourbillon at a suggested retail price of 14,900 CHF (~US$15,000), significantly lower than the 100,000 CHF or more charged by some other established Swiss watch brands.

References

Further reading

External links
Types of tourbillons at work

Articles containing video clips
Clocks
Horology
Swiss inventions
French inventions

ru:Механические часы#Турбийон